Code review (sometimes referred to as peer review) is a software quality assurance activity in which one or several people check a program mainly by viewing and reading parts of its source code, and they do so after implementation or as an interruption of implementation. At least one of the persons must not be the code's author. The persons performing the checking, excluding the author, are called "reviewers".

Although direct discovery of quality problems is often the main goal, code reviews are usually performed to reach a combination of goals:
 Better code quality  improve internal code quality and maintainability (readability, uniformity, understandability, etc.)
 Finding defects  improve quality regarding external aspects, especially correctness, but also find performance problems, security vulnerabilities, injected malware, ...
 Learning/Knowledge transfer  help in transferring knowledge about the codebase, solution approaches, expectations regarding quality, etc.; both to the reviewers as well as to the author
 Increase sense of mutual responsibility  increase a sense of collective code ownership and solidarity
 Finding better solutions  generate ideas for new and better solutions and ideas that transcend the specific code at hand.
 Complying to QA guidelines, ISO/IEC standards  Code reviews are mandatory in some contexts, e.g., air traffic software, safety-critical software

The above-mentioned definition of code review delimits it against neighboring but separate software quality assurance techniques: In static code analysis the main checking is performed by an automated program, in self checks only the author checks the code, in testing the execution of the code is an integral part, and pair programming is performed continuously during implementation and not as a separate step.

Review types 

There are many variations of code review processes, some of which will be detailed below. Additional review types are part of IEEE 1028

IEEE 1028-2008 lists the following review types:

 Management reviews
 Technical reviews
 Inspections
 Walk-throughs
 Audits

Inspection (formal) 

The historically first code review process that was studied and described in detail was called "Inspection" by its inventor Michael Fagan.
This Fagan inspection is a formal process which involves a careful and detailed execution with multiple participants and multiple phases. Formal code reviews are the traditional method of review, in which software developers attend a series of meetings and review code line by line, usually using printed copies of the material. Formal inspections are extremely thorough and have been proven effective at finding defects in the code under review.

Regular change-based code review (Walk-throughs) 
In recent years, many teams in industry have introduced a more lightweight type of code review. Its main characteristic is that the scope of each review is based on the changes to the codebase performed in a ticket, user story, commit, or some other unit of work. Furthermore, there are rules or conventions that embed the review task into the development process (e.g., "every ticket has to be reviewed"), commonly as part of a pull request, instead of explicitly planning each review. Such a review process is called "regular, change-based code review". There are many variations of this basic process. A survey among 240 development teams from 2017 found that 90% of the teams use a review process that is based on changes (if they use reviews at all), and 60% use regular, change-based code review. Also, most large software corporations such as Microsoft, Google, and Facebook follow a change-based code review process.

Efficiency and effectiveness of reviews 

Capers Jones' ongoing analysis of over 12,000 software development projects showed that the latent defect discovery rate of formal inspection is in the 60-65% range. For informal inspection, the figure is less than 50%. The latent defect discovery rate for most forms of testing is about 30%.
A code review case study published in the book Best Kept Secrets of Peer Code Review found that lightweight reviews can uncover as many bugs as formal reviews, but were faster and more cost-effective in contradiction to the study done by Capers Jones

The types of defects detected in code reviews have also been studied. Empirical studies provided evidence that up to 75% of code review defects affect software evolvability/maintainability rather than functionality, making code reviews an excellent tool for software companies with long product or system life cycles.
This also means that less than 15% of the issues discussed in code reviews are related to bugs.

Guidelines 

The effectiveness of code review was found to depend on the speed of reviewing.
Code review rates should be between 200 and 400 lines of code per hour.  Inspecting and reviewing more than a few hundred lines of code per hour for critical software (such as safety critical embedded software) may be too fast to find errors.

Supporting tools 

Static code analysis software lessens the task of reviewing large chunks of code on the developer by systematically checking source code for known vulnerabilities and defect types. A 2012 study by VDC Research reports that 17.6% of the embedded software engineers surveyed currently use automated tools to support peer code review and 23.7% expect to use them within 2 years.

See also 

 Committer
 Software review
 Software quality
 Best coding practices
 List of software development philosophies

External links 

 Five Code Review Antipatterns (Java Magazine, Best of 2020)

References 

Source code
Software review
Peer review